More Guitar is a live album by Richard Thompson compiled from recordings made during two shows at Washington, D.C. in November 1988. Two tracks from these tapes had previously appeared on the Watching The Dark compilation.

As the album's title suggests, Henry Kaiser's track selection for More Guitar places emphasis on Thompson's electric guitar soloing - though it stands by itself as a complete performance, and accordion player John Kirkpatrick is given an extended solo on The Animals hit "We Got To Get Out Of This Place". Thompson's playing on this album is technically impressive and fluent (even by the standards of a man long hailed as one of rock music's most talented and novel players), harmonically sophisticated and shows his wide stylistic range and influences - from British folk forms on "The Angels Took My Racehorse Away" to bebop on the opening "Don't Tempt Me".

More Guitar was never made available in retail stores. It can be obtained at Thompson's live shows or from his website http://www.richardthompson-music.com/.

Track listing
All songs written by Richard Thompson except where noted otherwises

"Don't Tempt Me"
"Can't Win"
"Jennie"
"Gypsy Love Songs"
"The Angels Took My Racehorse Away"
"When The Spell Is Broken"
"Shoot Out The Lights"
"I Still Dream" 
"Here Without You" (Gene Clark)
"A Bone Through Her Nose
"We Got To Get Out Of This Place" (Barry Mann, Cynthia Weil)
"Jerusalem On The Jukebox"

Personnel
Richard Thompson - electric guitar, acoustic guitar and vocals
John Kirkpatrick - accordion, backing vocals
Christine Collister - backing vocals
Clive Gregson - electric guitar, acoustic guitar, backing vocals and electric organ
Pat Donaldson - bass guitar
Kenny Aronoff - drums

References 

Richard Thompson - The Biography by Patrick Humprhies. Schirmer Books. 0-02-864752-1 
The Great Valerio by Dave Smith  
http://www.richardthompson-music.com/

2003 albums
Richard Thompson (musician) albums
Albums produced by Henry Kaiser (musician)
Self-released albums